Long Apung Airport  is an airport serving the city of Long Apung, located in the Malinau Regency, North Kalimantan, Indonesia.

Long Apung Airport is privately owned.

Airlines and destinations

References

External links 
Long Apung Airport - Indonesia Airport Global Website

Airports in North Kalimantan